Presidential elections were held in Belarus on 9 September 2001. The election should have been held in 1999, but a revised constitution adopted in 1996 extended incumbent Alexander Lukashenko's term for another two years.

Lukashenko was re-elected with 77.4% of the vote over two minor candidates. Voter turnout was 84%. A senior official for the Organization for Security and Co-operation in Europe noted that the pre-election environment was "not democratic" and would not describe it as "free and fair".

Results

References

Presidential elections in Belarus
Belarus
President
Belarus